Amitabha Chowdhury (11 November 1927 – 1 May 2015) was an Indian investigative journalist. He received the Ramon Magsaysay Award for his reporting on individual rights and community interests in India.

References

Indian investigative journalists
Writers from Kolkata
Ramon Magsaysay Award winners
1927 births
2015 deaths
Indian male journalists
Journalists from West Bengal